Raorchestes theuerkaufi is a species of frog of the genus Raorchestes found in the tea estates of Kadalar near Munnar, Idukki district, in the Western Ghats of Kerala in India. The species is named after Wolfgang Theuerkauf, a botanist and director of the Gurukula Botanical Sanctuary in Wayanad, Kerala.

See also
 Raorchestes kadalarensis

References

External links
 Gurukula Botanical Sanctuary
 

theuerkaufi
Frogs of India
Endemic fauna of the Western Ghats
Amphibians described in 2011